The First Sessions is a 2003 compilation album of early recordings by American rock musician Warren Zevon, including his short-lived folk pop duo lyme & cybelle.

Recording and release
The First Sessions represents most of the early recordings from Zevon, when he was a member of the Los Angeles folk rock scene of the 1960s, including his time in the duo lyme & cybelle with Violet Santangelo. The compilation is mostly made up of a series of singles the group recorded, along with scattered sessions that Zevon did as a solo artist.

Reception
The editorial staff of AllMusic Guide gave the release three out of five stars, with reviewer Richie Unterberger emphasizing how uneven the compilation is, going from "nice folk-rock-pop tunes" to "dull" ones. A review in No Depression calls the compilation "missed opportunities" that has several desirable qualities, from the liner notes and design of the packaging, to Zevon's "rapier wit" and a "powerful solo" in "A Bullet for Ramona".

Track listing
"Follow Me" (Violet Santangelo and Warren Zevon), by lyme & cybelle – 2:29
"Like the Seasons" (Santangelo and Zevon), by lyme & cybelle – 1:54
"I've Just Seen a Face" (John Lennon and Paul McCartney), by lyme & cybelle – 1:28
"Peeping and Hiding" (Jimmy Reed), by lyme & cybelle – 2:30
"If You Gotta Go, Go Now" (Bob Dylan), by lyme & cybelle – 2:46
"I'll Go On" (Santangelo and Zevon), by lyme & cybelle – 2:33
"Follow Me" (Santangelo and Zevon), by lyme & cybelle – 2:18
"(You Used To) Ride So High (Glenn Crocker and Zevon), by The Motorcycle Abeline – 2:36
"Outside Chance" (Zevon), by Warren Zevon – 2:13
"I See the Lights" (Zevon), by Warren Zevon – 2:15
"And If I Had You" (Santangelo and Zevon), by Warren Zevon – 2:34
"A Bullet for Ramona" (Paul Evans and Zevon), by Warren Zevon – 4:03
"Song 7" (Joe Glenn), by lyme & cybelle – 2:04
"Write If You Get Work" (Joe Glenn), by lyme & cybelle – 1:45

Personnel
Warren Zevon – vocals, bass guitar, guitar, except on "Song 7" and "Write If You Get to Work", production on "A Bullet for Ramona"
Jim Bell – backing vocals on "Song 7" and "Write If You Get to Work"
Ben Benay – guitar on "Song 7" and "Write If You Get to Work"
Lou Blackburn – trombone on "If You Gotta Go, Go Now"
Hal Blaine – drums on "Follow Me", "Like the Seasons", "Peeping and Hiding", "If You Gotta Go, Go Now", and "I'll Go On"
Curt Boettcher – backing vocals and production on "Song 7" and "Write If You Get to Work"
Dennis Budimir – guitar on "Follow Me", "Like the Seasons", "Peeping and Hiding", "If You Gotta Go, Go Now", and "I'll Go On"
Jules Chaiken – trumpet on "If You Gotta Go, Go Now"
Mike Deasy, Sr. – guitar on "Song 7" and "Write If You Get to Work"
Joseph DiFiore – cello on "Like the Seasons"
Dawn Eden – liner notes
Jesse Ehrlich – cello on "Like the Seasons"
Wayne Erwin – vocals and guitar on "Song 7" and "Write If You Get to Work"
Toxie French – drums on "Song 7" and "Write If You Get to Work" (possibly Jimmy Troxell)
Daniel Hersch – digital remastering
Bones Howe – percussion on "Follow Me"; "Like the Seasons"; "Peeping and Hiding"; "If You Gotta Go, Go Now"; and "I'll Go On", drums and percussion on "(You Used To) Ride So High", production on "Follow Me", "Like the Seasons"; "Peeping and Hiding"; "If You Gotta Go, Go Now"; "I'll Go On"; and "(You Used To) Ride So High", compilation
Larry Knechtel – organ and piano on "Follow Me", "Like the Seasons", "Peeping and Hiding", "If You Gotta Go, Go Now", and "I'll Go On"
Dick Leith – trombone on "If You Gotta Go, Go Now"
Lynn Malarsky – violin on "Like the Seasons"
Lee Mallory – backing vocals on "Song 7" and "Write If You Get to Work"
Cary E. Mansfield – compilation
Ollie Mitchell – trumpet on "If You Gotta Go, Go Now"
Michele O'Malley – backing vocals on "Song 7" and "Write If You Get to Work"
Joe Osborn – bass guitar on "If You Gotta Go, Go Now"
Bill Pitzonka – art direction, design, artwork
Lyle Ritz – bass guitar on "Follow Me", "Like the Seasons", "Peeping and Hiding", and "I'll Go On"
Sandy Salisbury – backing vocals on "Song 7" and "Write If You Get to Work"
Violet Santangelo – vocals on lyme & cybelle tracks, photography (credited as Laura Kenyon)
Joe Saxon – cello on "Like the Seasons"
Jerry Scheff – bass guitar on "Song 7" and "Write If You Get to Work"
Tommy Tedesco – guitar on "Follow Me", "Like the Seasons", "Peeping and Hiding", "If You Gotta Go, Go Now", and "I'll Go On"
Bob Thompson – conduction on "Follow Me", "Like the Seasons", "Peeping and Hiding", "If You Gotta Go, Go Now", and "I'll Go On"
Jimmy Troxell – drums on "Song 7" and "Write If You Get to Work" (possibly Toxie French)

See also
List of 2003 albums

References

External links

2003 compilation albums
Albums produced by Curt Boettcher
Albums produced by Bones Howe
Varèse Sarabande compilation albums
Warren Zevon compilation albums